Lidewij Welten (born 16 July 1990) is a Dutch field hockey player.

Welten is part of the Dutch national team in the youth and is seen as one of the most promising talents in the world. National coach Marc Lammers selected her for the 2008 Summer Olympics in Beijing, which was her first larger international tournament in which she participated.

At the 2008 Summer Olympics in Beijing she won an Olympic gold medal with the Dutch national team beating China in the final 2–0.  She won a second gold medal at the 2012 Summer Olympics.  At the 2016 Olympics, she was part of the Dutch team that won silver.

At the 2018 Women's Hockey World Cup in London, she won the gold medal with the Dutch team beating Ireland in the final 6–0 where she scored one of the goals. She was named player of the tournament.

References

External links
 

1990 births
Living people
Dutch female field hockey players
Olympic field hockey players of the Netherlands
Olympic gold medalists for the Netherlands
Olympic medalists in field hockey
Medalists at the 2008 Summer Olympics
Medalists at the 2012 Summer Olympics
Field hockey players at the 2008 Summer Olympics
Field hockey players at the 2012 Summer Olympics
Sportspeople from Eindhoven
Field hockey players at the 2016 Summer Olympics
Field hockey players at the 2020 Summer Olympics
Medalists at the 2016 Summer Olympics
Olympic silver medalists for the Netherlands
Female field hockey forwards
HC Den Bosch players
Medalists at the 2020 Summer Olympics
20th-century Dutch women
21st-century Dutch women